The Anti-corruption monument of Rwanda located at Kigali Convention Center (KCC), Rwanda, is a recognition of Rwanda’s anti-corruption policies by the Qatari government in 2019, during the International Anti-Corruption Excellence Awards. The impressive design of this hand monument is behind an Iraqi artist named Ahmed Al Bahrani.

Description 
The scripture depicts an extended palm, implying that Rwanda has nothing to conceal from the rest of the world. It has an open palm, which represents transparency and openness. The 12-meter-high monument is made up of pivots and linkages to represent the importance of worldwide alliances and collaborations in the fight against corruption.

The 186 triangular joints that make up the monument reflect the signatories to the United Nations Convention Against Corruption. Its goal is to inspire individuals to fight corruption with a never-say-die attitude and tenacity.

References 

Buildings and structures in Kigali